Sarvestan (also Romanized as Sarvestān; also known as Salvestān and Sarvīstān) is a village in Sarvestan Rural District, in the Central District of Bavanat County, Fars Province, Iran. At the 2006 census, its population was 431, in 126 families.

References 

Populated places in Bavanat County